No basta ser médico (English: In simply being a doctor) is a Mexican telenovela produced by Televisa and broadcast by Telesistema Mexicano in 1961.

Cast 
 Francisco Jambrina
 Tony Carbajal
 Bárbara Gil
 Carlos Navarro
 Dolores Tinoco
 Alberto Galán
 Silvia Caos
 Elsa Gutierrez
 David Reynoso

References

External links 

Mexican telenovelas
1961 telenovelas
Televisa telenovelas
1961 Mexican television series debuts
1961 Mexican television series endings
Spanish-language telenovelas